Brava (Isla Brava) is an island of Costa Rica. It is a fluvial island near the border with Nicaragua. It has an area of 44 km².

References
http://www.populstat.info/Americas/costarig.htm

Caribbean islands of Costa Rica